Igor Rudenkov (born March 5, 1995) is a Russian professional ice hockey player. He is currently playing with Amur Khabarovsk of the Kontinental Hockey League (KHL).

On October 19, 2014, Rudenkov made his Kontinental Hockey League debut playing with Torpedo Nizhny Novgorod during the 2014–15 KHL season.

References

External links

1995 births
Living people
Amur Khabarovsk players
Metallurg Magnitogorsk players
Russian ice hockey forwards
HC Sochi players
Torpedo Nizhny Novgorod players
Competitors at the 2019 Winter Universiade
Universiade medalists in ice hockey
Universiade gold medalists for Russia
Sportspeople from Nizhny Novgorod